{{DISPLAYTITLE:CO2 Coalition}}

The  Coalition is a nonprofit advocacy organization in the United States founded in 2015. Its claims conflict with the scientific consensus on climate change and it spreads misinformation about climate change.

History 
The  Coalition is a successor to the George C. Marshall Institute, a think tank focusing on defense and climate issues which closed in 2015. William O'Keefe, a chief executive officer of the Marshall Institute and former CEO of the American Petroleum Institute, continued as CEO of the  Coalition.  William Happer, an emeritus professor of physics known for disagreeing with the consensus on climate change, was another  Coalition founder from the Marshall Institute. Happer said the association with climate contrarianism had negatively affected Marshall Institute funding, viz: "Many foundations that would normally have supported defense would not do it because of the Marshall name being associated with climate". The defense activities of the Marshall Institute were moved to the Center for Strategic and International Studies 

In its first four years, the  Coalition received over $1 million in contributions from foundations that support conservative cause and from energy industry officials.

Activities 
The  Coalition was one of over 40 organizations to sign a letter dated May 8, 2017, to President Donald Trump thanking him for his campaign promise to withdraw from the Paris Agreement, which Trump announced on June 1, 2017. 

In 2021 the  Coalition submitted a public comment opposing climate change disclosure rules by the U.S. Securities and Exchange Commission. The Coalition asserted "There is no 'climate crisis' and there is no evidence that there will be one," and further "Carbon dioxide, the gas purported to be the cause of catastrophic warming, is not toxic and does no harm." Both assertions are at odds with the scientific consensus on climate change. 

 The  Coalition had published twelve white papers, six 'climate issues in-depth', eight science policy briefs, coalition member testimonies, and coalition member publications. The group continues to speak publicly and issue press releases on issues relating to energy production, climate change, and advocating for hydrocarbon based fuels.

See also
 Americans for Prosperity
 Cato Institute
 The Heartland Institute
 Manhattan Institute

References

External links 
 
  Coalition at DeSmog

Climate change denial
Conservative organizations in the United States
Organizations of environmentalism skeptics and critics
Political and economic think tanks in the United States
Non-profit organizations based in Washington, D.C.